Joseph Daniel Kaylor (July 6, 1916 – February 20, 1999) was an American male handball player. He was a member of the United States men's national handball team. He was part of the  team at the 1936 Summer Olympics, playing three matches. On club level he played for Deutscher Sport Club NY in New York, the United States. Kaylor also boxed in the 1930s and got the nickname "K.O.".

Personal
Kaylor had nine brothers and sisters. In 1947 he married Mary McWilliams and had 4 children.

References

1916 births
1999 deaths
American male handball players
Field handball players at the 1936 Summer Olympics
Olympic handball players of the United States
People from New York (state)